Promises to Keep: On Life and Politics  is a memoir by then-senator Joe Biden, (later the 46th president of the United States) first published by Random House on July 31, 2007. A paperback version was published on August 28, 2008. It was published in the run-up to his 2008 presidential campaign.

Contents
Biden begins by recounting his life growing up in a Roman Catholic family in Scranton, Pennsylvania and later Wilmington, Delaware. He details the 1972 car accident that killed his wife Neilia and their one-year-old daughter Naomi, and the struggles he faced in its aftermath. He then writes about the second chance he was given upon meeting Jill Jacobs in 1975, as he began his career representing Delaware in the U.S. Senate. The book also explores his beleaguered 1988 presidential campaign, during which he suffered from two brain aneurysms, and the physical and political recovery he later made.

Parts of the text describing Biden's early childhood are drawn verbatim from the 1992 book What It Takes: The Way to the White House.

Cultural reference
The title of the book was inspired by Robert Frost's 1922 poem "Stopping by Woods on a Snowy Evening."

Reception
The Christian Science Monitor praised the book saying "Biden is a master storyteller and has stories worth telling." Likewise, The New York Times called it "a compelling personal story", while Salon commended Biden's response to tragedy as "both admirable and likable".

References

External links
Biden speaking about the book at the National Press Club (August 1, 2007)

2007 non-fiction books
2008 non-fiction books
American political books
Books by Joe Biden
English-language books
Random House books
American memoirs
Books written by presidents of the United States